Awaba may refer to:

 Awaba, New South Wales, a suburb of Lake Macquarie in New South Wales, in Australia
 Awaba railway station, New South Wales, a train station of Lake Macquarie in New South Wales, in Australia
 Awaba Airport, an airport in Awaba, in the Western Province of Papua New Guinea